The Lafontaine (or La Fontaine) Baronetcy, of the City of Montreal in the County of Montreal, was a title in the Baronetage of the United Kingdom. It was created on 28 August 1854 for the Canadian statesman Louis-Hippolyte Lafontaine. The title became extinct on the early death of his son, the second Baronet, in 1867.

Lafontaine (or La Fontaine) baronets, of the City of Montreal (1854)
Sir Louis-Hippolyte Lafontaine, 1st Baronet (1807–1864)
Sir Louis-Hippolyte La Fontaine, 2nd Baronet (1862–1867)

Arms

See also
 Lafontaine (surname)

References

Extinct baronetcies in the Baronetage of the United Kingdom